And Also the Trees is the debut studio album by English post-punk band And Also the Trees. It was released in February 1984 by record label Reflex.

Background 
The album was recorded in September 1983 and produced by the Cure's Lol Tolhurst. Their sound stood out from that of their gothic rock peers, as it was greatly influenced by the rural surroundings of Worcestershire (the band's place of origin), poetry (on the lyrical side) and Old England. John Peel described their sound as being "too English for the English".

Release 
And Also the Trees was released in February 1984. It was reissued in 1992 on the German label Normal Records.

Reception 

AllMusic wrote, "While lacking in immediately catchy songs – partially due to the fact that at this point the band generally favoured series of verses or poetry without rhyme to more conventional lyric structures – the album still kicks up some smoke".

Track listing

Personnel 

 Simon Huw Jones – vocals
 Justin Jones – guitar
 Steven Burrows – bass guitar
 Nick Havas – drums

 Technical

 Laurence Tolhurst – production
 David Motion – engineering

References

External links 

 

1984 debut albums
Gothic rock albums by English artists
And Also the Trees albums